The George F. Rodgers Shipbuilding Company was a shipbuilder located in Astoria, Oregon.

History
The shipyard was incorporated on August 6, 1917 by George F. Rodgers (former mayor of Salem, Oregon), C.A. Koppison, and L.E. Rolfe who took a five year lease out on a dock in Astoria, Oregon. The shipyard was located on 7.5 acres at the mouth of the Columbia River between the Port of Astoria to the northeast and the Spokane, Portland and Seattle Railway to the south. It included 4 berths of 300 feet in length with launching ways extending 210 feet, a blacksmith shop, sawmill, and joiner shop.  In August 1917, due to a shortage of merchant shipping during World War I, the shipyard was awarded a contract to build four 3,500-ton Design 1001 cargo ships by the Emergency Fleet Corporation (EFT). The ships were often referred as "Ferris"-type due to their design by naval architect Theodore E. Ferris. The facility was operating on October 1, 1917 and the first keel was laid later in the month. The SS Blue Eagle was completed in 1918 followed by the SS Capines, SS Wohnabe, and SS Munra in 1919. The shipyard was awarded contracts to build 4 more Design 1001 ships at a bid of $300,000 per ship. Construction commenced on two hulls (Granon, Crantor) before the EFT cancelled the contracts due to the end of World War I. The unfinished hulls became the subject of litigation after the Port of Astoria bought out the remainder of the lease to the Rodgers shipyard in order to build a multi-million dollar import-export pier. In January 1920, the company agreed to purchase all the remaining unfinished hulls (34 in total) commissioned by the EFC in the United States for $170,000. The company subsequently arranged a deal with the EFT to take over the Seattle shipyard of Skinner & Eddy which was ceasing operations but withdrew from the agreement in May 1920. In September 1924, Rodgers was killed in a plane crash at the Oregon State Fair and the company was dissolved.

References

American boat builders
Defunct shipbuilding companies of the United States
Defunct manufacturing companies based in Oregon
American companies established in 1917
Manufacturing companies established in 1917
Astoria, Oregon